Pedro Nolasco (February 2, 1962 – September 15, 1995) was a Dominican boxer, who won the bronze medal in the men's bantamweight category at the 1984 Summer Olympics in Los Angeles, United States.

This was the first Olympic medal of the Dominican Republic. A year earlier he won a silver at the 1983 Pan American Games. He was born in La Romana, Dominican Republic.

Nolasco turned pro in 1986 and had limited success, possibly a result of having moved up the professional ladder too quickly.  In 1987 he dropped a pair of fights to future champion Tony Lopez.  Later in the year he lost a by first-round knockout to former world champ Victor Callejas. In 1989 he took on Maurizio Stecca for the newly created WBO Featherweight Title, but lost in a 6th-round TKO.

Nolasco was shot and killed in an attempted robbery at his home in La Romana on September 15, 1995 at the age of 33.

Results

1979 Pan American Games
Defeated Antonio Toledo (Brazil) points
Defeated Jorge Rodríguez (Colombia) points
Defeated Jerome Coffee (United States) points
Lost to Alberto Mercado (Puerto Rico) points

1983 Pan American Games
Lost to Manuel Vilchez (Venezuela) points

1984 Olympic Games
Defeated Ljubisa Simic (Yugoslavia) points
Defeated John Siryakibbe (Uganda) points
Defeated John John Molina (Puerto Rico) points
Defeated Sung-Kil Moon (South Korea) TKO 1
Lost to Maurizio Stecca (Italy) points

References

 
 sports-reference

1962 births
1995 deaths
Bantamweight boxers
Olympic boxers of the Dominican Republic
Olympic bronze medalists for the Dominican Republic
Boxers at the 1979 Pan American Games
Boxers at the 1983 Pan American Games
Boxers at the 1984 Summer Olympics
People from La Romana, Dominican Republic
Olympic medalists in boxing
Medalists at the 1984 Summer Olympics
Dominican Republic male boxers
Pan American Games silver medalists for the Dominican Republic
Pan American Games medalists in boxing
1990s murders in the Dominican Republic
1995 murders in North America
Deaths by firearm in the Dominican Republic
Dominican Republic murder victims
Male murder victims
People murdered in the Dominican Republic
Medalists at the 1979 Pan American Games
Medalists at the 1983 Pan American Games